Olive Christian Malvery was an Anglo-Indian journalist, best known for her investigations into the working conditions of women and children in London.

Early life

Malvery was born in Lahore, in the Punjab, in 1871 from parents of European and Indian ancestry. Following her parents' separation, she and her brother were raised as Anglican in India by her maternal grandparents. Both siblings were well-educated.

She moved to London in 1900 to train as a professional singer at The Royal College of Music. To support herself during this time she gave elocution lessons, wrote fiction for periodicals and gave drawing-room performances about Indian legends.

Journalistic career

In 1904, she was commissioned to write a seven part series of articles for Pearson's Magazine. For this she explored women's work in various trades by disguising herself as a street singer, street peddler, factory girl, shop girl, costermonger, waitress, and barmaid. The series 'The Heart of All Things' appeared in the magazine between November 1904 and May 1905, before being published together in her first book 'The Soul Market'. The success of this book led to Malvery being in great demand as a public speaker.

Malvery donated some of the royalties from her books to Christian charities and to build two shelters for homeless women in London. Malvery describes the success of The Soul Market as "the first book that roused the public to shame and sympathy". This would appear to have affected charitable giving, as she later went on to say "To-day there are a great many Mission which have been founded by people who were stirred by that book".

Malvery also lectured for the temperance movement in Europe and North America.

Works

 The Alien Question (1905)
 The Soul Market. New York: McClure, Phillips & Co, 1907
 Baby Toilers. London: Hutchinson, 1907
 Thirteen Nights. London: Hodder and Stoughton, 1908.
 The Speculator. London: T. Werner Laurie, 1908.
 Year and a Day. London: Hutchinson, 1912.
 Mackirdy, Olive C. M, and W N. Willis. The White Slave Market. London: S. Paul & Co, 1912. 
 Mackirdy's Weekly (1914)

Personal life

When Malvery married Archibald Mackirdy, a Scottish-born U.S. diplomat, she invited a thousand London working girls as wedding guests. Her bridesmaids were costermongers from Hoxton.

Malvery and her husband had three children before he died in 1911.

She died aged 37 in 1914, having been ill with cancer. The cause of death was apparently from an accidental overdose of sedatives.

References

External links
East End Women's Museum. Olive Christian Malvery: journalist, 'lecturer, reciter, and social worker'.
Olive Christian Malvery: Creating a biography of Edwardian Britain's pioneering undercover journalist.

1871 births
1914 deaths
People from Lahore
Indian women journalists
Undercover journalists
Anglo-Indian people
Temperance activists
Indian women's rights activists